Pareh Sar (also known as Bāzār Pareh Sar) is a city and capital of Pareh Sar District, in Rezvanshahr County, Gilan Province, Iran.  At the 2006 census, its population was 7,875, in 2,027 families.

References

Populated places in Rezvanshahr County
Cities in Gilan Province